Harry Giles may also refer to:

Harry Giles (basketball) (born 1998), American basketball player
Harry Giles (educator) (born 1930), Canadian educator
Harry Giles (footballer) (1911–1986), Australian rules footballer with Essendon

See also
Harry Gyles (1880–1959), Australian rules footballer with Carlton
Henry Giles (disambiguation)